Garang Township (Mandarin: 尕让乡) is a township in Guide County, Hainan Tibetan Autonomous Prefecture, Qinghai, China. In 2010, Garang Township had a total population of 12,789 people: 6,687 males and 6,102 females: 2,870 under 14 years old, 9,172 aged between 15 and 64 and 747 over 65 years old.

References 

Township-level divisions of Qinghai
Guide County